Jed Riffe is an American filmmaker and founder of Jed Riffe Films + Electronic Media.  For over 30 years his documentary films have focused on social issues and politics including: Native American histories and struggles (Ishi, the Last Yahi, California's "Lost" Tribes, Who Owns the Past?,) and agriculture, food and sustainability issues (Ripe for Change,).  He lives and works in the San Francisco Bay Area.

Biography
Riffe was born in Dallas, Texas, and attended El Centro College in Dallas, where he studied journalism.  In 1968, he published The Good Life magazine and soon  became politically involved in the civil rights and anti-war movements in Texas.

He organized demonstrations as part of the national Vietnam Moratorium Committee campaign, and was hired as the Texas organizer for Clergy and Laymen Concerned about Vietnam. It was then that he began showing documentary films as a tool for social change. His filmmaking is an extension of his early activism.

His most acclaimed film, Ishi, the Last Yahi was released theatrically and broadcast nationally on the PBS series The American Experience. The film went on to win "Best Documentary" awards at eight major national and international film festivals and was nominated for a national Emmy award in 1994.

Riffe served as series and executive producer on California and the American Dream, an independently produced national series was featured on PBS.

Riffe's other major credits include interactive producer and video director of the first Africana Interactive Studies Center at Merritt College; interactive producer/writer for four interactive exhibits for the Autry Museum of American History; interactive producer and writer for the award-winning “Public Broadcasting In Public Places.” Riffe and his team designed, programmed, built and installed four innovative, interactive media kiosks with 160 minutes of specially edited interactive content from the “California and the American Dream” series. Riffe wrote, produced and directed “TV of Tomorrow,” an interactive prototype demonstrating the possible ways interactive content might appear on television in the future. In 1990, Riffe produced 86 minutes of video for three interactive History Information Stations, at the Oakland Museum of California.

Riffe also consults on film and video distribution

Filmography
 A Dangerous Idea: Eugenics, Genetics and the American Dream (producer) 2018 
 The Long Shadow (co-producer) 2017 
 Andre: The Voice of Wine (producer) 2017
 A New Color (executive producer) 2016 
 In the Name of the Gene (producer) 2016
 Shut Up, Sit Down and Listen (producer) 2011
 To Chris Marker, an Unsent Letter (executive producer) 2012
 Heist: Who Stole the American Dream? (consulting producer) 2011
 Smokin' Fish (executive producer) 2010 
 Convention (line producer) 2008
 California and the American Dream (series producer)  2006
 California's "Lost" Tribes (producer, director, co-writer) 2006
 The New Los Angeles (executive producer) 2006
 The Price of Renewal (executive producer) 2006
 Ripe for Change (producer) 2006
 Waiting to Inhale (producer, director) 2006
 Ruthie and Connie: Every Room in the House (consulting producer) 2002
 Who Owns the Past? (producer, director) 2000
 Ishi, the Last Yahi (producer, director) 1992
 Rosebud to Dallas (producer, director, co-writer) 1977
 Promise and Practice'' (producer, director, co-writer) 1975

Awards and recognition

Waiting to Inhale: Marijuana, Medicine and the Law
"Golden Eagle", 2007 CINE Washington, D.C.
"Mejor Documental, 2007 Festival Internacional de Cine Pisoactivo, Santiago de Chile
"Best Documentary", 2006 Eureka International Film Festival
"Co-Best Documentary Film", 2005 New Jersey Film Festival
"Gold Award", 2005 Worldfest Houston

Ripe for Change
"Best of the Best", 2008 Tucson Slow Food Film Festival
"Golden Eagle", 2007 CINE Washington, D.C.
"Special Jury Award", 2007 Mendocino Film Festival
"Best Eco Film-MovieMaker Magazine Award", 2007 Wine Country Film Festival
Public Broadcasting in Public Places, “Best Interactive Visitor’s Center Presentation”
Chicago International Film Festival's, 2007 INTERCOM Competition

California's "Lost" Tribes
"Golden Eagle", 2007 CINE Washington, D.C.
2001 Gerbode Fellow for Excellence in Non-Profit Management

Who Owns the Past?
"Bronze Award-Historical Documentary", 2000 Worldfest Houston

Ishi, the Last Yahi
"Emmy Nomination-Outstanding Historical Program", 1994 National News and Documentary Emmy Awards, National Academy of Television Arts and Sciences
"Gold CINDY Award of Merit"
"Special Awards: for Writing, Directing and Editing", Association of Visual Communicators
"Outstanding Documentary", 1994 Western Heritage Awards, National Cowboy Hall of Fame
"Golden Eagle", 1994 CINE, Washington, D.C.
"Prix Planète-Cable", 1994 Tréizième Bilan Du Film Ethnographique, The Musée De L'homme, Paris, France
"Best Documentary Film (Long): Produced by Non-Indians", 1994 Red Earth
"Der Ted", Audience Choice—Best Independent Film, The 1993 Munich International Film Festival
"Best Of Festival", 1993 National Educational Film And Video Festival
"Gold Hugo" Best History/Biography, The 1993 Chicago International Film Festival
"Best Documentary Film (Short)", 1992 American Indian Film And Video Festival, San Francisco
"Selected for Exhibition", 1994 Margaret Mead Film Festival
"Certificate of Merit", 29th Annual Gabriel Awards, Unda USA
"Honorable Mention", 1993 Society Of Visual Anthropology Film Festival, American Anthropological Association

References

External links
 

American filmmakers
Living people
People from Dallas
People from the San Francisco Bay Area
University of Dallas alumni
Year of birth missing (living people)